Elnur Amanov (born 13 July 1977 in Baku, Azerbaijani SSR) is an Azerbaijani taekwondo athlete.

Amanov won a gold medal at the 2008 European Taekwondo Championships in Rome.

References

1977 births
Living people
Azerbaijani male taekwondo practitioners
European Taekwondo Championships medalists
20th-century Azerbaijani people
21st-century Azerbaijani people